The 2008–09 ISU Grand Prix of Figure Skating was a series of six international invitational competitions in the 2008–09 season. Skaters competed in the disciplines of men's singles, ladies singles, pair skating, and ice dancing on the senior level. At each event, skaters earned points based on their placements and the top six scoring skaters or teams at the end of the series qualified for the 2008–09 Grand Prix of Figure Skating Final, held in Goyang, South Korea.

The Grand Prix series set the stage for the 2009 European Figure Skating Championships, the 2009 Four Continents Figure Skating Championships, the 2009 World Junior Figure Skating Championships, and the 2009 World Figure Skating Championships, as well as each country's national championships. The Grand Prix series began on October 23, 2008 and ended on December 14, 2008.

The Grand Prix was organized by the International Skating Union. Skaters competed for prize money and for a chance to compete in the Grand Prix Final. The corresponding series for Junior-level skaters was the 2008–09 ISU Junior Grand Prix.

Qualifying
Skaters who reached the age of 14 by July 1, 2008 were eligible to compete on the senior Grand Prix circuit. The top six skaters from the 2008 World Championships were seeded and were guaranteed two events. Skaters who placed 7th through 12th were also given two events, though they were not considered seeded.

Skaters/teams who medaled at the 2007–08 Junior Grand Prix Final or the 2008 World Junior Championships were guaranteed one event. Skaters who medaled at both the Junior Grand Prix Final and the World Junior Championships were guaranteed only one event.

The host country was allowed to send three skaters/teams of their choosing in each discipline.

The spots remaining were filled from the top 75 skaters/teams in the 2007–08 Season's Best list.

Schedule

Assignments

Men

Medal summary

Points
After the final event, the 2008 NHK Trophy, the six skaters/teams with the most points advanced to the Grand Prix Final. The qualification point system is as follows:

There were seven tie-breakers in cases of a tie in overall points:
Highest placement at an event. If a skater placed 1st and 3rd, the tiebreaker is the 1st place, and that beats a skater who placed 2nd in both events.
Highest combined total scores in both events. If a skater earned 200 points at one event and 250 at a second, that skater would win in the second tie-break over a skater who earned 200 points at one event and 150 at another.
Participated in two events.
Highest combined scores in the free skating/free dancing portion of both events.
Highest individual score in the free skating/free dancing portion from one event.
Highest combined scores in the short program/original dance of both events.
Highest number of total participants at the events.

If a tie remained, it was considered unbreakable and the tied skaters all qualified for the Grand Prix Final.

Final points
Skaters in bold qualified for the Grand Prix Final.

Prize money
The total prize money was $180,000 per event in the series and $272,000 for the Final. All amounts are in U.S. dollars. Pairs and dance teams split the money. The breakdown was as follows:

References

External links
 
 
 
 
 
 
  

Isu Grand Prix Of Figure Skating, 2008-09
ISU Grand Prix of Figure Skating